The 1974 Missouri Tigers football team was an American football team that represented the University of Missouri in the Big Eight Conference (Big 8) during the 1974 NCAA Division I football season. The team compiled a 7–4 record (5–2 against Big 8 opponents), finished in a tie for second place in the Big 8, and was outscored by opponents by a combined total of 217 to 204. Al Onofrio was the head coach for the fourth of seven seasons. The team played its home games at Faurot Field in Columbia, Missouri.

The team's statistical leaders included Tony Galbreath with 870 rushing yards, 955 yards of total offense, and 48 points scored, Steve Pisarkiewicz with 828 passing yards, Mark Miller with 522 receiving yards, and Greg Hill with 63 points scored.

Schedule

References

Missouri
Missouri Tigers football seasons
Missouri Tigers football